L'Île-Saint-Denis is a French commune in the northern suburbs of Paris, Île-de-France.

The commune is entirely contained on an island of the Seine River, hence its name.

Along with the communes of Saint-Denis and Saint-Ouen-sur-Seine, L'Île-Saint-Denis will form the Olympic Village of the 2024 Summer Olympics.  This allows 85% of athletes to be 30 minutes from their competition venues.

Heraldry

Transport
Several transit connections are located nearby. The closest station to l'Île-Saint-Denis is Saint-Denis station, which is an interchange station on Paris RER line D and on the Transilien Paris – Nord suburban rail line. This station is located in the neighboring commune of Saint-Denis,  from the town center of l'Île-Saint-Denis.

Tram T1 stops near Île-Saint-Denis's town hall. Bus route 237 runs along the length of the island.

Demographics
The island is the result of the joining of several smaller islands (which helps explain its current length): L’île Saint-Denis, l’île Saint-Ouen, l’île des Vannes and l'île du Châtelier.

Since the 1960s l'Île-Saint-Denis has housed immigrants, mostly from North African countries. Nadir Dendoune, a local author, said that l'Île-Saint-Denis had racial and ethnic diversity in the 1980s, as the neighborhood housed various groups of poor people, including Arabs, Black people, ethnic French, and other Europeans, and that at that time half of the students in area schools were White. In 2005, according to Dendoune, few of the students were White.

Education
There are three primary schools in the commune: École Samira Bellil, École Paul Langevin, and École Jean Lurçat.

Collège Alfred Sisley, a junior high school, is on the island.

See also

Communes of the Seine-Saint-Denis department

References

External links

 City council website

Communes of Seine-Saint-Denis